The Aero A.300 was a Czechoslovak bomber aircraft that first flew in 1938 as a much refined development of the A.304 (despite what the numbering would suggest).

Designed by Aero as a replacement for the obsolete, locally-built Bloch MB.200 bombers Czechoslovak Air Force, the Aero A-304 transport/bomber formed the basis for its design. The new aircraft mounted Bristol Mercury IX radial engines rated at 610 kW/820 hp and carried three machine guns for defense.  The A-300 was faster than any other Czechoslovakian aircraft in the inventory except for the Avia B-35 fighter.  Despite showing much promise, development and production of the aircraft was interrupted by the outbreak of World War II.

Operators

Czechoslovak Air Force

Slovak Air Force (1939–45)

Specifications (A.300)

See also

References 

A.300
1930s Czechoslovakian bomber aircraft
Aircraft first flown in 1938
Twin piston-engined tractor aircraft